Akosua Agyapong (also spelled Agyepong; born 17 November 1969), is a Ghanaian female highlife singer and television personality. She was honored by the organizers of 3Music Awards for her achievement in the entertainment industry in Ghana.

Early life
Akosua Agyapong was born on 17 November 1969 in Accra, Ghana, to  Asante and Akyem parents. She had her secondary education at the Holy Child High School in Cape Coast. Her mum was a Catholic while her father was an Anglican.

Musical career
Agyapong began singing at an early age and was discovered by highlife artiste Nana Ampadu in the 1990s. She is regarded as a highlife legend. In 1992 she formed the Highlife Supergroup NAKOREX together with fellow Highlife artists Nat Brew and Rex Omar, the group's name being an acronym made up of the first letters of each member's name and released the song 'Kpanlogo'.

Her first album was, ‘Frema’ which was released on January 1, 1990. The ‘Frema’ album had songs full of inspiration like ‘Me ye Obaa’ which became an instant hit, ‘Born again’, ‘Anan tuo’, ‘San be hwe wo mba’ among others.

After the success of her album, she met Nat Brew and Rex Omar, who inspired her to release her subsequent album entitled ‘Esiwa’, another instant hit. It was Akosua Agyapong second album. After NAKOREX, she went into a long hiatus and later resurfaced as a gospel artist, she is simply unpredictable. Akosua has five albums to her credit, one in collaboration with NAKOREX and another as a member of NAKOREX. She was honored in August 2019  at event dubbed “Celebrating Akosua Adjepong 30@50”. This was to celebrate her for having chalked 30 years as an artiste.

Married life 
Amandzeba Nat Brew officially began to date her in 1994 and they got married a couple of years later. She is now married to Prophet Daniel Asamoah-Larbi, after a divorce with  Amanzeba Nat Brew of NAKOREX fame.

She has six children.

References

Ghanaian highlife musicians
Living people
1959 births
Alumni of Holy Child High School, Ghana